Gilbert Earl Patterson (September 22, 1939 – March 20, 2007) was an American Holiness Pentecostal leader and minister who served as the National Presiding Bishop and Founder of the Bountiful Blessings Ministries  and Chief Apostle of the Church of God in Christ (COGIC), Incorporated. Bishop Patterson was the second youngest person to ever be elected Presiding Bishop of COGIC at the age 60 in 2000, second to his predeceased uncle Bishop J. O. Patterson, Sr who was 56 when he was elected Presiding Bishop in 1968.

On March 28, 2007, the United States Senate passed a resolution celebrating the life of Patterson.  The sponsors were Senators Barack Obama, Carl Levin, John Kerry, Lamar Alexander and Bob Corker.

References

1939 births
2007 deaths
20th-century American bishops
21st-century American bishops
African-American Christians
American Pentecostals
William Tyndale College alumni
LeMoyne–Owen College alumni
Members of the Church of God in Christ
Presiding Bishops of the Church of God in Christ
Church of God in Christ pastors
American television evangelists
African-American television personalities
People from Humboldt, Tennessee
People from Memphis, Tennessee